Jinnah Town is a residential neighborhood and a municipal administration area in the city of Faisalabad, Punjab, Pakistan.

References

Tehsil municipal administrations of Faisalabad
Metropolitan areas of Pakistan